Yoann Djidonou (born 17 May 1986) is a professional footballer who plays as a goalkeeper for Championnat National 2 club Romorantin. Born in France, he is a former Benin international.

Club career
Born in Domont, France, Djidonou has played club football for Racing Paris, Entente SSG, Red Star, Libourne, Racing Paris and Mulhouse. In June 2013, he signed for Championnat National 2 side Romorantin.

International career
Djidonou made his international debut for Benin in 2007, and represented them at the Africa Cup of Nations in 2008 and 2010. He has also represented them in FIFA World Cup qualifying matches.

References

External links
 

1986 births
Living people
People from Domont
Footballers from Val-d'Oise
French sportspeople of Beninese descent
Citizens of Benin through descent
Association football goalkeepers
Beninese footballers
French footballers
Benin international footballers
2008 Africa Cup of Nations players
2010 Africa Cup of Nations players
Racing Club de France Football players
Championnat National players
Championnat National 2 players
Championnat National 3 players
Red Star F.C. players
FC Libourne players
FC Mulhouse players
Entente SSG players
SO Romorantin players
Black French sportspeople